Giorgia Todrani, best known as Giorgia (born 26 April 1971) is an Italian singer, songwriter, musician, record producer, and radio host.

Known for her soulful voice, aided by a wide vocal range, high belting register and great vocal abilities.
Her vocal range spans 4 octaves. One of the most famous Italian singers, she has released ten studio albums all enjoying commercial success. Giorgia has become fairly well known throughout Europe as an ambassador for Italian pop music, and has also achieved moderate success in Canada and Latin America.

For her voice's qualities she has been compared to Whitney Houston and Mina, and has been defined "fourth-best voice in the world". Billboard magazine called her "one of the most popular Italian singers" and stated that "she could have made it (a great success) in the USA too".

Giorgia holds the first place among the artists Italian women of her generation for number of weeks in the Fimi-Nielsen chart, and she has sold over 7 million records worldwide, with 12 top-ten albums of which 5 number-one on the Italian album chart, and 24 top-ten singles of which 5 number-one hits on the Italian singles chart. She has participated three times at the Sanremo Music Festival, in 1995, in 1996, in 2001 and in 2023, resulting at the first, third, second and sixth place respectively. At the Sanremo Music Festival 1995, she has won 4 prizes in the same night (Festival First Awards, Radio/TV Awards, Authors Awards and "Mia Martini" Awards), holding the unbeated Sanremo record of a winning artist collecting all the prizes at once.
In her career Giorgia has won 8 Italian and Wind Music Awards, a David di Donatello, a Nastro d'argento and a "Premio Lunezia".

Biography
Giorgia was born in Rome and started  performing at an early age in several Roman Jazz clubs. She was influenced by classic soul and jazz artists such as Aretha Franklin, Whitney Houston, Stevie Wonder, Ella Fitzgerald, Michael Jackson among others. She recorded two live albums in the early 1990s, called One more go round and A Natural Woman.

Career

Debut album
Her debut was on the stage of the Ariston theatre for the 1994 Sanremo Music Festival when she sang "E poi" in the category Nuove Proposte (New Acts). At that festival she won 7th position in the final New Act chart (losing to Andrea Bocelli who praised her in his winning speech). E poi, is still nowadays one of her most famous songs.

Her debut-album Giorgia sold more than 160,000 records (it was a best seller in Italy and enjoyed good success in Germany too). A few months later Luciano Pavarotti asked her to perform with him in a duet at the annual Pavarotti & friends show in Modena, Italy where she gave a performance of Queen's Who Wants to Live Forever. She also sang with the famous tenor.
In 1994 Giorgia won the European Award as "best Young Italian artist".

Sanremo Music Festival and second album
In 1995 she returned to the Sanremo Music Festival, singing "Come saprei". She won the competition and the critics' award too, becoming the second artist to achieve that (the first being Domenico Modugno) but being the first Italian female singer to win both awards. During the competition she won 4 awards. Her second album Come Thelma & Louise sold more than 300,000 copies.
In the same year, Todrani recorded the song "Vivo per lei" with tenor Andrea Bocelli.

Strano il mio destino (1996) 
In 1996 she entered the Sanremo Music Festival for the third time with the song "Strano il mio destino" and ended in third place. Strano il mio destino – Live & studio 95/96 is the title of her third release, which included live tracks, the Sanremo single and another studio recording. The album sold 270,000 copies.

Mangio troppa cioccolata (1997) 

In the middle of 1997 she released a cover of an old Italian song by Ornella Vanoni called "Un'ora sola ti vorrei", with a new music sound r&b oriented and a new image; later that year, her 3rd studio album "Mangio troppa cioccolata" was released and started a new dimension on her career, with less ballads and more uptempos, focusing more on the sound and in the interpretation than in the vocals, something that would become a prerogative in her subsequent releases. This album was released in ten European countries enjoying good commercial success. The same year music television "MTV Europe"asked Giorgia to present a tv program, but she rejected the proposal.

Girasole (1999) 
After the release of a song from another soundtrack movie called "Il cielo in una stanza" (a cover of an Italian song by Gino Paoli),in early 1999 she released her 4th studio album called "Girasole" , a very melodic and pop oriented record that gave her more success, helped by the hit single "Girasole", one of the top selling Italian songs of the middle of 1999. The same year she toured internationally alongside jazz legend Herbie Hancock.

2000 
In 2000 Ray Charles invited her to one of his concerts and asked her to sing  "Georgia on My Mind" after she told him that her father named her Giorgia in honour of the song.
Giorgia produced "Girasole" by herself; thanks to this album (one of the most successful of her career) she became more widely known. The same year she sang a duet with Michael McDonald, in Turin during her concert and in his concert in Milan.
In the middle of 2000, in her Fai Sentire La Tua Voce Tour 2000 she performed a duet with Lionel Richie in All Night Long at the Ericsson Summer Festival.
2000 was also the year of her performance at the Primo Maggio festival that included a reworking of Prince's Nothing compares to you (2 U).

Senza ali (2001) 

In 2001, she returned to Sanremo Music Festival finishing in second place with the song "Di Sole e d'Azzurro" written by Zucchero and included in her 5th studio Album "Senza Ali" , which features Herbie Hancock as special guest in "Il mare sconosciuto" track. Previously Giorgia had already performed with Hancock during his European tour dedicated to George Gershwin in (1999), and during a concert at the Royal Festival Hall of London along with Youssou N’Dour in 2000.

Greatest hits-Le cose non-vanno mai come credi (2002) 

In 2002 she released her first Best of album titled Greatest hits – Le cose non-vanno mai come credi which sold more than 700,000 copies and stayed in the Italian chart for over a year. The album spawned some Italian hits and was still in the Italian chart in 2008.
The year ended with a duet with ex-Boyzone Ronan Keating. The song was We've Got Tonight, a cover of a hit by Bob Seger, and the duet with Keating was released across Europe.

Ladra di Vento (2003)
In 2003 she released her 6th studio album, Ladra di Vento, which included her biggest hit: Gocce di Memoria. The song reached the top spot of the Italian FIMI singles chart and became the best selling single of 2003, with 130,000 copies sold. The song reached the top 40 of the European singles chart.
Gocce di Memoria was the original theme-song from Turkish-Italian film-maker Ferzan Ozpetek's movie "la Finestra di fronte" Facing Windows starring Giovanna Mezzogiorno, it gained Giorgia many awards including the "David di donatello", the "Silver ribbon" and three "Italian music awards".

Mtv Unplugged (2005)
In 2005, Giorgia was the first Italian artist to release an MTV Unplugged recorded in Milan. The live CD includes acoustic versions all of her major hits. The album has been certified triple platinum in Italy and gained Giorgia many awards. She was supported by the band of Prince, Terence Blanchard and during the concert she dueted with soul star Ricky Fanté.

Stonata (2007)
In 2007 she released her 7th studio album, Stonata. The album debuted at the second position of the Italian chart and was certified double platinum. The album featured a duet with the Italian singer Mina. The song was Poche Parole and was the first duet for Mina, in her fifty-year-long career, with an Italian female.

Spirito libero Viaggi di voce 1992–2008 (2008)
On 21 November, Giorgia released her second greatest hits compilation (the first one was released in 2002), but this will be her first "Anthology" album with 3 cds full of hits, new songs, covers and new versions of some of her old songs; the first single is "Per fare a meno di te", which is the soundtrack of the movie "Solo un padre" directed by Luca Lucini, that hit Italian screens on 28 November 2008.

Dietro le apparenze (2011)

In 2011 Giorgia released her 8th studio album, Dietro le apparenze, which included the 2011 summer hit: Il mio giorno migliore (platinum, with more than 30,000 copies). The album also featured a duet with one of the most important Italian singers, Eros Ramazzotti, in Inevitabile; as well as other collaborations: Passerà l'estate by Marina Rei; É l'amore che conta, the second single, written by Busbee; and Tu mi porti su performed with Jovanotti (single certified double platinum, with more than 60.000 copies). The album Dietro le apparenze debuted at the first position of the Italian chart and was certified double platinum.

Senza paura (2013) and the Limited Gold Edition
In November 2013 Giorgia released her 9th studio album, Senza paura; the first single was Quando una stella muore (certified platinum, with more than 30.000 copies). The album also featured duets with international singers Alicia Keys, in I Will Pray (Pregherò) (the second single, certified gold); and Olly Murs, in Did I lose you. The third single, Non mi ami, with music featured by Fraser T. Smith and Natasha Bedingfield in July 2014 was certified platinum (with more than 30.000 copies), and the fourth single, Io fra tanti, on October was certified gold.

The album Senza paura debuted at the first position of the Italian chart, and was certified double platinum disk (with more than 120.000 copies). In 2014 it received a new nomination at the MTV Europe Music Awards in the category "Best Italian Act". In October 2014, the singer released Senza paura - Limited Gold Edition, containing a double CD: one with the same tracks as the recorded album, and an extra CD with live content from her 2014 tour Senza Paura; as well as a DVD containing extra content from her live show, the official music videos for her singles (Quando una stella muore, Non mi ami, Io fra tanti) and some unreleased backstage material.

On 24 October 2014, she released her fifth single from the album xSenza Paura, "La mia stanza".

Oronero (2016)
On 15 February 2016, Giorgia's official site confirmed that she was working on a new album. The album was produced by Michele Canova, who also produced her previous two albums. On 12 September Giorgia revealed the title of her new single, Oronero, announcing that it would be available for digital download from 20 September. On 28 November 2016, the track was certified platinum in Italy, after having sold more than 50,000 copies.

The album of the same name is the tenth studio album released by the Roman singer, and was released on 28 October 2016. It contains 15 tracks, 10 of which were written by Giorgia herself, as well as numerous collaborations with Italian and international artists.

On 8 February 2017, Giorgia performed at the Sanremo Music Festival 2017 competition. During the second evening of the festival, she performed her second single from Oronero: Vanità (single certified platinum), followed directly after by a medley of her most famous Sanremo performances: E poi, Come saprei and Di sole e d'azzurro.

On 18 April 2018, the album Oronero was certified double platinum disk (with more than 100.000 copies).

Blu and Sanremo Music Festival (2023) 
On 4 December 2022, it was officially announced Giorgia participation in the Sanremo Music Festival 2023. "Parole dette male" was later announced as her entry for the Sanremo Music Festival 2023. The single was announced as the lead track of Giorgia's new album "Blu", the first of a multi-part project, which is scheduled for release on February 17, 2023.

Personal life
She was nominated as Best Italian act at the MTV Europe Music Awards 2005 in Lisbon for the Italian hit "Gocce di Memoria".
She is the only Italian artist to have sung with Elton John. The British singer called Giorgia One of the best and beautiful voices in the world.

Giorgia was engaged from 1997 to 2001 to the singer Alex Baroni, who died in 2002 in a car accident.

In 21 June 2009 Giorgia was involved in the relevant concert "Amiche per l'Abruzzo" organized by Laura Pausini at the San Siro Stadium in Milan for the people hit by the earthquake in Abruzzo. She had duets with Elisa, Laura Pausini and other of the greatest Italian female singers. The DVD of this concert is available in Italy.

In the winter of 2009, Giorgia confirmed rumors that she and her fiancé, singer/songwriter and dancer Emanuel Lo, were expecting their first child. On 18 February 2010, during the third night of the Sanremo Music Festival, it was announced that Giorgia had given birth to a baby boy, Samuel.

She is a fan of football team Lazio.

Discography

Albums
 Giorgia (1994)
 Come Thelma & Louise (1995)
 Mangio troppa cioccolata (1997)
 Girasole (1999)
 Senza ali (2001)
 Ladra di vento (2003)
 Stonata (2007)
 Dietro le apparenze (2011)
 Senza paura (2013)
 Oronero (2016)
 Pop Heart (2018)
 Blu¹ (2023)

Filmography

As a voice actress

References

External links 

  

 

1971 births
Living people
Singers from Rome
Italian pop singers
Sanremo Music Festival winners
21st-century Italian singers
21st-century Italian women singers